Slodowy or Słodowy is a surname. Notable people with the surname include:

Adam Słodowy (1923–2019), Polish inventor and writer
Peter Slodowy (1948–2002), German mathematician